H Street is a set of east–west streets in several of the quadrants of Washington, D.C. It is also used as an alternate name for the Near Northeast neighborhood, as H Street NW/NE is the neighborhood's main commercial strip.

History
In the 19th century, H Street around North Capitol was the center of a small settlement called Swampoodle which became an entire neighborhood by the 1850s. It played an important role in the construction of Washington, D.C. by providing the workforce needed to build projects such as Union Station.

H Street was separated in two with the railway track where it intersected with Delaware Avenue when Union Station started to be built in 1907. This split created distinct neighborhoods east and west of the railway which have grown independently. Thanks to involvement of the Northeast Washington Citizens' Association, the plan was changed to having a  tunnel built to retain the connection between the two sides of the track.

The H Street NE/NW neighborhood was one of Washington's earliest and busiest commercial districts, and was the location of the first Sears Roebuck store in Washington. H Street NE went into decline after World War II and businesses in the corridor were severely damaged during the 1968 riots. This part of the street did not start to recover until the 21st century.

In 2002, the District of Columbia Office of Planning initiated a community-based planning effort to help revitalize the H Street NE corridor.

In the mid-2000s, the Arts and Entertainment District began to revitalize as a nightlife district. The Atlas Theater, a Moderne-style 1930s movie theater that had languished since the 1968 riots—was refurbished as a dance studio and performance space where Mosaic Theater Company of DC and Step Afrika! are in residence, and is now the anchor of what is now being called the Atlas District. Live music venues, such as the Red and the Black and the Rock & Roll Hotel; and restaurants and bars such as the Argonaut, Dangerously Delicious Pies, Showbar Presents the Palace of Wonders, the Pug, and Sticky Rice.  While several of these venues have since closed or replaced by new businesses, as of the summer of 2020, the Pie Shop, the Pug, and Sticky Rice are still popular in the neighborhood.

H Street NE rapidly re-developed after 2007. The same forces that led to the redevelopment of the neighboring NoMa neighborhood acted on the H St NE neighborhood The median sales price of houses on or near H Street NW from July to September 2009 was $417,000. H Street NE was voted the sixth-most hipster place in America by Forbes magazine in September 2012. This process of gentrification led to tensions with some previous residents, who felt that they were becoming less welcome as the neighborhood changed and worried about being priced out.

As H Street NE continued to develop, its annual neighborhood festival, the H St Festival has grown into the largest neighborhood celebration in the city.  It is often chronicled in DC news outlets such as these articles from 2008 2010 2016 2017 2018 2019.

H Street NE is also home to the country's first American Sign Language friendly Starbucks location on the 600 block of H St NE due to its location in the vicinity of Gallaudet University.

Route

H Street NW
In Northwest Washington, H Street is the main street in Chinatown and one of the major east-west streets downtown.  When Pennsylvania Avenue in front of the White House was closed to vehicular traffic in the 1990s, crosstown traffic that had formerly used Pennsylvania Avenue was rerouted to H and I streets. The street also passes Lafayette Park and through the George Washington University campus and the Foggy Bottom neighborhood before terminating at Rock Creek.

H Street NE

In Northeast Washington, H Street continues uninterrupted from North Capitol Street (crossing over train tracks just north of Union Station on the "Hopscotch Bridge") to 15th Street NE, where it terminates in what is known as the "starburst intersection", where it meets Bladensburg Road, 15th Street, Benning Road, Maryland Avenue, and Florida Avenue.

After this intersection, there is a gap of two blocks where the street is interrupted by Hechinger Mall. H Street continues for a short segment between 17th and 24th Streets NE as part of the Carver Langston neighborhood. The road does not continue east of the Anacostia River.

The H Street Corridor is the part running from 2nd Street NE to Starburst Plaza and is also known as the Atlas District and Near Northeast. It includes the part north of H Street NE to Florida Ave NE and south to F Street NE. The second portion of H Street (after Starburst Plaza) is not considered part of the H Street Corridor.

Some of the significant buildings included:
 1872: the Home for the Aged Men and Women on H Street NE between 2nd and 3rd Street NE.
 1897: the Northeast Temple and Market at 1119-1123 H Street NE, an indoor marketplace and a Masonic Temple. The first buildings electrified on H Street NE. It was demolished and replaced by another smaller building.
 1913: the Apollo Theater at 624-634 H Street NE. It was replaced by the Ourisman Chevrolet Service Center. Today, the "Apollo" building stands there.
 1938: the Atlas Theater at 1313-33 H Street NE. A former movie theater repurposed as a Performing Art Center. This building was an important part in the revitalization of the neighborhood.

H Streets SW and SE
The city plan on which D.C. was laid out provides for a parallel H Street in the southwest and southeast quadrants of the city.  Subsequent government actions, most notably the construction of I-395/I-295, disconnected the southern H Street in several places.  In its current form, it does not run consecutively for more than two blocks at any point except for its easternmost extremity, near Fort Dupont Park.

Notable residents

Notable residents who lived on H Street include:
 George B. McClellan, on the south side, between 4th and 5th Streets NW (now occupied by the Government Accountability Office)
 Phil Radford, Greenpeace Executive Director
 Mary Surratt, near the southwest corner of Sixth Street NW (now occupied by Wok N Roll restaurant)
 Anthony A. Williams, D.C. mayor from 1999 to 2007
 Elizabeth Schuyler Hamilton, wife of Alexander Hamilton
 Jewel Lewis-Hall, owner of the famous Michael Jackson house

References
Notes

Citations

Bibliography

External links

 H Street Live! | Community Organization
 H Street NE Strategic Development Plan
 What H Street Looked Like in 1947

Streets in Washington, D.C.
Shopping districts and streets in the United States
Neighborhoods in Northeast (Washington, D.C.)
Near Northeast (Washington, D.C.)